Shanaqi-ye Sofla (also Romanized as Shanāqī-ye Soflá or Shenaqi Soflá; also known as Shanāqī-ye Pā’īn, Shanqī-ye Pā’īn, and Shenāqī) is a village in Qushkhaneh-ye Pain Rural District, Qushkhaneh District, Shirvan County, North Khorasan Province, Iran. At the 2006 census, its population was 462, in 95 families.

References 

Populated places in Shirvan County